Richard Albert Dandridge (August 16, 1891 – April 7, 1978) was an American Negro league shortstop in the 1910s.

A native of Washington, DC, Dandridge attended the University of Pennsylvania. He played for the Lincoln Giants in 1919, posting four hits in 17 plate appearances over four recorded games. Dandridge died in Washington, DC in 1978 at age 86.

References

External links
Baseball statistics and player information from Baseball-Reference Black Baseball Stats and Seamheads

1891 births
1978 deaths
Lincoln Giants players
Baseball shortstops
Baseball players from Washington, D.C.
20th-century African-American sportspeople